trueEX Group LLC, known as trueEX, is a New York based financial technology company established on October 21, 2010, by Founder Sunil G. Hirani, a Co-Founder of Creditex Group Inc. and his Co-founder, Jim Miller. Its headquarters are in the Flatiron District of New York City.

trueEX is organized as a Delaware limited liability company and is a wholly owned subsidiary of trueEX Group.  It is established as an electronic exchange platform for global interest rate swaps (IRS), a market estimated at over $300 trillion.

On September 28, 2012, trueEX became the first electronic swaps exchange to receive approval by the U.S. Commodity Futures Trading Commission (CFTC) as a Dodd-Frank compliant Designated Contract Market (DCM).

trueEX was created in response to the Dodd-Frank Wall Street Reform and Consumer Protection Act, which imposed new regulations and standards on the financial markets following the 2008 financial crisis. The company will initially trade interest rate swaps, will add other liquid derivatives to its portfolio and is the first to provide back loading, termination, re-balancing and compaction services for the interest rate swaps market.

In the first year of operation, trueEX has on boarded 11 clearing houses, 14 dealers, and 63 buy-side firms. trueEX has executed over $2.7 trillion in PTC, RFQ, Compressions, and Post Trade Services for the buy-side and dealer community.

Awards 

 2017 Global Capital Global Derivatives Award: RFQ SEF of the Year
 2017 Global Capital Americas Derivatives Award: RFQ SEF of the Year
 2017 FStech Award: Best Trading System
 2017 Risk Awards: OTC Trading Platform of the Year
 2016 Global Capital Global Derivatives Award: RFQ SEF of the Year
 2016 Risk Awards: SEF of the Year

Media 
Witad Awards 2018 Write-Ups: Exchange Professional of the Year—Karen O’Connor, TrueEX [London, March 30, 2018]

Swaps Pioneer's Crypto Venture Takes Two Big Steps Forward  [New York, March 12, 2018]

trueEX Unit to Launch Regulated Marketplace for Digital Assets [New York, March 12, 2018]

References

Financial services companies based in New York City